Now Abad   is a village in the Khwahan District of Badakhshan in north-eastern Afghanistan.

See also
Badakhshan Province

References 

Populated places in Khwahan District